Orasturmia is a genus of flies in the family Tachinidae.

Species
O. vallicola Reinhard, 1947

References

Exoristinae
Diptera of North America
Tachinidae genera